Recess is an American animated television series created by Paul Germain and Joe Ansolabehere (credited as "Paul and Joe") and produced by Walt Disney Television Animation. The series focuses on six elementary school students and their interaction with other classmates and teachers. Recess first aired on ABC from 1997 through to 2001, and reruns aired on Disney Channel in the United States.

The show premiered on September 13, 1997, on ABC as part of Disney's One Saturday Morning, with the first season spanning 26 episodes. The second season premiered on September 12, 1998. Disney brought the show back for a third season of 16 episodes which began on September 11, 1999, while the fourth season premiered at the same time, but airing on UPN as part of Disney's One Too. Season five was notably shorter than the previous ABC seasons. This was because the staff were busy with Recess: School's Out. Outside of the U.S., the individual 11 minute episodes of season three and season four were weaved together to create one long season. Season five premiered on September 9, 2000 while season six premiered on October 31, 2001 concluding the series with the last episode airing on November 5, 2001.

Series overview

Episodes

Season 1 (1997–98)

Season 2 (1998–99)

Season 3 (1999–2000)

Season 4 (1999–2000)

Season 5 (2000–01)

Season 6 (2001)

Films

Crossover special

References

External links
 
 Recess Trilogy
 
 
 

Episodes
Lists of American children's animated television series episodes
Lists of Disney television series episodes